The Halifax Thunderbirds are a lacrosse team based in Halifax, Nova Scotia, that plays in the National Lacrosse League (NLL). the 2022 NLL season is their 2nd season the NLL. They were formerly the Rochester Knighthawks but moved to Halifax, as Rochester gained an expansion franchise.

Regular season

Final standings

Game log

Playoffs

Roster

Goaltenders

Defenseman
 

 

Forwards

 

 

Transition

Practice

Injured

Head Coach
 Mike Accursi

Assistant Coaches
 Chad Culp
 Jason Johnson
 Roger Chrysler
 Billy Dee Smith

Athletic Performance Coach
 Dan Noble

Equipment Manager
 Dave Sowden

Entry Draft
The 2021 NLL Entry Draft took place on August 28, 2021. The Thunderbirds made the following selections:

References

Halifax Thunderbirds seasons
Halifax Thunderbirds season